Prashant Kishor, colloquially known as PK, is an Indian political strategist and tactician. A public health expert by training, he worked with the United Nations for eight years before venturing into Indian politics and working as a political strategist.

Kishor has worked as a political  strategist for BJP to gain his knowledge then he worked for the BJP, JD(U), INC, AAP, YSRCP, DMK and TMC. His first major political campaign was in 2011 to help Narendra Modi, then Chief Minister of Gujarat get re-elected to the CM Office for a third time in the Gujarat Assembly Elections 2012. However, he came to wider public attention when Citizens for Accountable Governance (CAG), an election-campaign group he conceptualised, helped the Narendra Modi-led Bharatiya Janata Party (BJP) win an absolute majority in the 2014 Lok Sabha election.

Personal life and career
Kishor is from the Konar village, Sasaram of Rohtas district but shifted to Buxar in Bihar. From there, Kishor completed his secondary education. He is married to Jahnavi Das, a physician hailing from Guwahati, Assam, with whom he has a son.

Reportedly working pro bono, and without holding any office in the BJP or Gujarat Government, Kishor was employed as a political strategist for BJP's pre-election campaign. He was employed as the political strategist of Janata Dal (United) political party on 16 September 2018.

Work as a political strategist
In 2013, Kishor created Citizens for Accountable Governance (CAG), a media and publicity company in preparation for the May 2014 general election of India. Kishor was credited with formulating an innovative marketing & advertising campaign for Narendra Modi— the Chai pe Charcha discussions, 3D rallies, Run for Unity, Manthan and several social media programmes.

In 2015, Kishor and other CAG members regrouped as I-PAC to work with Nitish Kumar, in a bid to win a third term as Chief Minister in the 2015 Bihar Legislative Assembly election. The claims were that Kishor dramatically influenced the strategy, resources and alliances for the campaign. Upon winning the Bihar elections, Chief Minister Nitish Kumar named Kishor as his advisor for planning and programme implementation, with a brief look for ways to implement the seven-point agenda that was promised during Kumar's election campaign. In 2020, Kishor was involved with the 2020 Bihar Legislative Assembly election as well.

In 2016 the Indian National Congress employed Kishor for the 2017 Uttar Pradesh Legislative Assembly election. However, these elections were a failure for Congress and Kishor as BJP won more than 300+ seats and Congress could only manage 7 seats. This was also the first time Kishor failed to help a party win the elections.

Kishor has successfully worked with several other political parties in India as well including Amarinder Singh for the 2017 Punjab Legislative Assembly election, Y. S. Jagan Mohan Reddy for the 2019 Andhra Pradesh Legislative Assembly election,  Arvind Kejriwal for the 2020 Delhi Legislative Assembly election, Mamata Banerjee for the 2021 West Bengal Legislative Assembly election, and M. K. Stalin for the 2021 Tamil Nadu Legislative Assembly election as well.

Retirement from political strategy 
After the win of the AITC in the 2021 West Bengal Legislative Assembly election and DMK in the 2021 Tamil Nadu Legislative Assembly election, Kishor declared that he was quitting as an election strategist. In an interview with NDTV on 2 May 2021, Kishor told anchor Sreenivasan Jain on live TV,  "I do not want to continue what I am doing. I have done enough. Time for me to take a break and do something else in life. I want to quit this space." A year later on 2 May 2022, Kishor hinted toward the formation of a political outfit of his own with a tweet that said that it was time to go to the "Real Masters, The People" and on the path of "Jan Suraaj-Peoples Good Governance"—similar to his last recent campaign titled "Baat Bihar Ki". After his retirement from being a political strategist, Kishor has also mulled launching a political party from his home state, Bihar. Kishor later on announced a 3,000 km Padyatra which would take place across Bihar, and would involve Kishor meeting with people from all across the state. The "Padyatra" would take place under his Jan Suraaj campaign which could potentially lead to a formation of a political party in Bihar.

References 

1970s births
Campaign managers
2014 Indian general election
People from Bihar
Living people
UNICEF people
Indian officials of the United Nations
Janata Dal (United) politicians